Croome may refer to:

Places
Croome, East Riding of Yorkshire, hamlet in the East Riding of Yorkshire, England
Croome, Worcestershire, a National Trust property in Worcestershire - includes Croome Court and Croome Park
Croome D'Abitot, a village in the Malvern Hills District in the county of Worcestershire, England
Earls Croome, a village in Worcestershire, England
Hill Croome, a village and parish in Worcestershire, England

People
Beric John Croome, an Advocate of the High Court of South Africa, a Chartered Accountant CA (SA), tax law scholar and pioneer of taxpayers' rights in South Africa
Judy Croome, born in Zvishavane, Zimbabwe is a South African novelist, short story writer, and poet
Rodney Croome, Australian, member of the Order of Australia

See also
Croom (disambiguation)